Guy Eardley Joseph (born 1966) is a Saint Lucian politician and former representative for the constituency of Castries South East for the United Workers Party. Joseph was defeated in the St. Lucia 2021 General Election.

Joseph won the seat at the general election held on 11 December 2006, defeating Menissa Rambally. In the government of Prime Minister John Compton, sworn in on 19 December 2006, Joseph was appointed Minister for Communications, Works, Transport and Public Utilities.

References

Living people
Members of the House of Assembly of Saint Lucia
1957 births
Government ministers of Saint Lucia
United Workers Party (Saint Lucia) politicians